The 2012 Gateshead Council election took place on 3 May 2012 to elect members of Gateshead Metropolitan Borough Council in Tyne & Wear, England. This was on the same day as other 2012 United Kingdom local elections.

Resulting Council Composition

Ward results
Spoilt votes are not included below.

Birtley ward

Blaydon ward

Bridges ward

Chopwell & Rowlands Gill ward

Chowdene ward

Crawcrook & Greenside ward

Deckham ward

Dunston & Teams ward

Dunston Hill & Whickham East ward

Felling ward

High Fell ward

Lamesley ward

Lobley Hill & Bensham ward

Low Fell ward

Pelaw & Heworth ward

Ryton, Crookhill & Stella ward

Saltwell ward

Wardley & Leam Lane ward

Whickham North ward

Whickham South & Sunniside ward

Windy Nook & Whitehills ward

Winlaton & High Spen ward

References

2012 English local elections
2012
21st century in Tyne and Wear